Jani Virtanen may refer to:

Jani Tapani Virtanen, Finnish footballer
Jani Virtanen (ice hockey), Finnish ice hockey player